Stereo imaging refers to the aspect of sound recording and reproduction of stereophonic sound concerning the perceived spatial locations of the sound source(s), both laterally and in depth. An image is considered to be good if the location of the performers can be clearly identified; the image is considered to be poor if the location of the performers is difficult to locate. A well-made stereo recording, properly reproduced, can provide good imaging within the front quadrant. 

More complex recording and reproduction systems such as surround sound and Ambisonics can offer good imaging all around the listener and even including height information. Imaging is usually thought of in the context of recording with two or more channels, though single-channel recording may convey depth information convincingly.

The quality of the imaging arriving at the listener's ear depends on numerous factors, of which the most important is the original miking, that is, the choice and arrangement of the recording microphones including the size and shape of the microphone diaphragms, and microphone placement and orientation relative to other microphones.

For many listeners, good imaging adds markedly to the pleasure of reproduced music. One may speculate that this is due to the evolutionary importance to humans of knowing where sounds are coming from, and that imaging may, therefore, be more important than some purely aesthetic considerations in satisfying the listener.

See also
 Panning (audio)
 Pan law
 Phantom center

External links 
 Online Stereo Imaging Test (LEDR)

Stereophonic sound